Zdenek Rykr (26 October 1900 – 15 January 1940) was a Czechoslovak painter, illustrator, journalist, and theater designer.

Life
Zdenek Rykr was born in the Chotěboř train station. When he was seven his family moved to Kolín, where his father, a railway inspector, had been transferred. This is where he spent his childhood and student years. After graduating from the grammar school he was not accepted to the Academy of Fine Arts in Prague, and so he chose to study Art History and Classical archaeology at the faculty of philosophy, where he completed a doctorate in 1924. Despite the knowledge he accumulated during his studies, his artistic abilities were self-taught. At the beginning his artwork is mostly paintings, and subsequently evolves into graphic design.

In 2016, film director Andrea Culková released H*art On, a documentary about the lives of Zdenek Rykr and his wife, Milada Součková. In the film, Součková is portrayed by Czech musical artist Sonja Vectomov.

Work
In 1925, Rykr illustrated Emil Vachek’s Bidýlko, and from 1925 to 1927 he was a theater designer at the National Theatre (Prague). In parallel, he worked as a graphic designer for advertising, for example for the Baťa company. His designs for the Maršner chocolate company, for which he created the blue Orion star for the Kofila chocolate wrapper, are still famous today. He also created designs for the Kolín oil refinery, Kulík coffee, Čedok and [Škoda Auto].

His art gradually strayed from the realism of his early paintings, and from the 1930s he focused on the creation of assemblages and collages, which foreshadowed his work of the 1960s. He got inspired by his numerous travels across the globe, and was strongly influenced by Surrealism and Oriental Calligraphy.

In the 1920s he also worked as a journalist, contributed to the creation of the satiric magazine Trh, authored pamphlets, and in 1930-31 edited the magazine Domov a svět. His pointed criticism and controversial opinions made him an unpopular figure in the 1920s and 30s. He is associated with the Devětsil generation of avant-garde artists rather as an outsider or lone wolf. He tried on many styles, which he quickly discarded as worthless. His generation saw him as a disjointed eclectic or as the dark conscience of the avant-garde.

At first he exhibited as a guest with the Tvrdošíjni group of painters, and later had several solo shows and even exhibited his work at the [Société des Artistes Indépendants Salon des indépendants in Paris], where unlike in his native country it was a great success.

To avoid the Gestapo he committed suicide by throwing himself under a train in the Barrandov section of Prague on 15 January 1940.

His wife, Milada Součková (1898–1983) was a Czech writer, literary historian, and diplomat, known for introducing Modernist techniques to Czech literature.

Bibliography
 LAHODA, Vojtěch. Zdenek Rykr 1900-1940. Praha : Galerie hlavního města Prahy, 2000. 377 s.  (in Czech).
 URBAN, Jiří. Zdenek Rykr : Výběr z malířského díla. Roudnice nad Labem : Galerie Roudnice nad Labem, 1983. 24 s.

References

External links

 List of works in the database of the Czech National Library, whose author or topic is Zdenek Rykr
 Zdenek Rykr in the archive of the National Theatre (Prague)

1900 births
1940 deaths
Czechoslovak graphic designers
Czechoslovak scenic designers
Czechoslovak painters
Suicides by train
1940 suicides
Suicides in Czechoslovakia